Sanchai and Sonchat Ratiwatana were the defending champions and successfully defended their title, defeating Jonathan Erlich and Alexander Peya 6–4, 1–6, [10–6] in the final.

Seeds

Draw

References
 Main Draw

OEC Kaohsiung - Doubles
2017 Doubles
2017 in Taiwanese tennis